89th Regiment of 89th Infantry Regiment may refer to:

 89th Cavalry Regiment, a unit of the United States Army
 89th Regiment of Foot (disambiguation), several units of the British Army
 89th (Cinque Ports) Heavy Anti-Aircraft Regiment, Royal Artillery
 89th Punjabis, a unit of the British Indian Army

American Civil War regiments:
 89th Illinois Volunteer Infantry Regiment, a unit of the Union Army
 89th Indiana Infantry Regiment, a unit of the Union Army

See also 
 89th Division (disambiguation)